429 Transport Squadron of the Royal Canadian Air Force is one of four squadrons attached to CFB Trenton in Trenton, Ontario. The squadron was originally formed as a bomber squadron of the Royal Canadian Air Force (RCAF) attached to RAF Bomber Command during the Second World War.

History
The squadron was formed on 7 November 1942 as the 429 (Bomber) Squadron RCAF with No 4 Group at RAF East Moor, but reassigned to No. 6 Group shortly after and disbanded on May 31, 1946.  The squadron moved to RAF Leeming in 1943.

The current transport role was established at RCAF Station St Hubert on August 21, 1967, as 429 Tactical Transport Unit and in August 1981 renamed 429 Transport Squadron and moved to CFB Winnipeg. The final move was in 1990 to 8 Wing in Trenton, Ontario. 429 Squadron was disbanded in 2005.

Two years later in August 2007, 429 Squadron was again re-activated, this time operating the CC-177 Globemaster III strategic transport aircraft.  It used these new aircraft in support of Canada's operations in Afghanistan.

Aircraft used by 429 Sqn include:

World War II
 Vickers Wellington - Medium bomber/ASW November 1942 to August 1943 
 Handley Page Halifax - heavy bomber August 1943 to March 1945 
 Avro LancasterB I and III - heavy bomber/ASW March 1945 to May 1946
 Douglas CC-129 Dakota Transport aircraft

Post War
 Douglas CC-129 Dakota Transport aircraft
 De Havilland Canada CC-115 Buffalo Transport aircraft
 Lockheed CC-130 Hercules transport aircraft
 Boeing CC-177 Globemaster III - strategic transport

References

Canadian Department of National Defence - Honours & Recognition for the Men and Women of the Canadian Armed Forces 10th Edition - 2016.  Accessed 14 March 2019

Royal Canadian Air Force squadrons
Canadian Forces aircraft squadrons